Moïssala Airport  is a public use airport located near Moïssala, Mandoul, Chad.

See also
List of airports in Chad

References

External links 
 Airport record for Moïssala Airport at Landings.com

Airports in Chad
Mandoul Region